The Original Sound of Sheffield '83/'87 is a Some Bizzare Label greatest hits compilation.

Reception
Sean Carruthers of Allmusic said of the compilation, "This is the sound that launched a thousand techno acts."  Victoria Segal of NME said, "This fine compilation ... shows Cabaret Voltaire emerging from the gloom of industrial experimentation into the bright lights of proto-house."

Track listing

References

2001 greatest hits albums
Cabaret Voltaire (band) albums
Some Bizzare Records compilation albums